"I'll Be the One" is a song written by Don Reid, and recorded by American country music group The Statler Brothers.  It was released in May 1987 as the first single from their album Maple Street Memories.  The song peaked at number 10 on the Billboard Hot Country Singles chart.

Chart performance

References

1987 singles
1987 songs
The Statler Brothers songs
Mercury Records singles
Songs written by Don Reid (singer)
Song recordings produced by Jerry Kennedy